Westchester County is located in the U.S. state of New York. It is the seventh most populous county in the State of New York and the most populous north of New York City. According to the 2020 United States Census, the county had a population of 1,004,456, its highest decennial count ever and an increase of 55,344 (5.8%) from the 949,113 counted in 2010. Established in 1683, Westchester was named after the city of Chester, England. The county seat is the city of White Plains, while the most populous municipality in the county is the city of Yonkers, with 211,569 residents per the 2020 U.S. Census.

The annual per capita income for Westchester was $67,813 in 2011. The 2011 median household income of $77,006 was the fifth-highest in New York (after Nassau, Putnam, Suffolk, and Rockland counties) and the 47th highest in the United States. By 2021, the county's median household income had risen to $105,387. Westchester County ranks second in the state after New York County for median income per person, with a higher concentration of incomes in smaller households. Simultaneously, Westchester County had the highest property taxes of any county in the United States in 2013.

Westchester County is one of the centrally located counties within the New York metropolitan area. The county is positioned with New York City, plus Nassau and Suffolk counties (on Long Island, across Long Island Sound), to its south; Putnam County to its north; Fairfield County, Connecticut, to its east; and Rockland County and Bergen County, New Jersey, across the Hudson River to the west. Westchester was the first suburban area of its scale in the world to develop, due mostly to the upper-middle-class development of entire communities in the late 19th century and the subsequent rapid population growth.

Westchester County has numerous road and mass transit connections to New York City, and the county is home to the headquarters of large multinational corporations including IBM, Mastercard, PepsiCo, and Regeneron Pharmaceuticals. Westchester County high school students often feature prominently as winners of the International Science and Engineering Fair and similar STEM-based academic awards.

History
At the time of European contact in the 16th and 17th centuries, the Native American inhabitants of present-day Westchester County were part of the Algonquian peoples, whose name for themselves was Lenape, meaning the people. They called the region Lenapehoking, which consisted of the area around and between the Delaware and Hudson Rivers. Several different tribes occupied the area, including The Manhattans, and the Weckquaesgeek and Siwanoy bands of the Wappinger in the south, and Tankiteke, Sintsink and Kitchawank Wappinger in the north.

The first European explorers to visit the Westchester area were Giovanni da Verrazzano in 1524 and Henry Hudson in 1609. Dutch settlers began arriving in the 1620s, followed by settlers from England in the 1640s. Westchester County was one of the original twelve counties of the Province of New York, created by an act of the New York General Assembly in 1683. At the time it included present-day Bronx County, and abutted then-Dutchess County to the north. By 1775, Westchester was the richest and most populous county in the colony of New York. Although the Revolutionary War devastated the county, recovery after the war was rapid. In 1788, five years after the end of the war, the county was divided into 20 towns. In 1798, the first federal census recorded a population of 24,000 for the county.

Two developments in the first half of the 19th century—the construction of the first Croton Dam and Aqueduct, and the coming of the railroad—had enormous impacts on the growth of Westchester. The Croton Dam and Aqueduct was begun in 1837 and completed in 1842; now a National Historic Landmark, the Croton Aqueduct is considered one of the great engineering achievements of the 19th century. In the 1840s, the first railroads were built in Westchester, and included the New York and Harlem Railroad, the Hudson River Railroad, and the New York and New Haven Railroad. The railroads often determined the growth of a town, and the population shifted from Northern to Southern Westchester. By 1860, the total county population was 99,000, with the most populated city being Yonkers.

The period following the American Civil War enabled entrepreneurs in the New York area to create fortunes, and many built large estates, such as Lyndhurst, in Westchester. During the latter half of the 19th century, Westchester's transportation system and labor force attracted a manufacturing base, particularly along the Hudson River and Nepperhan Creek. In 1874, the western portion of the present Bronx County was transferred to New York County, and in 1895 the remainder of the present Bronx County was also transferred to New York County. These would later split from Manhattan to form a county.

During the 20th century, the rural character of Westchester would transform into the suburban county known today. The Bronx River Parkway, completed in 1925, was the first modern, multi-lane limited-access roadway in North America. The development of Westchester's parks and parkway systems supported existing communities and encouraged the establishment of new ones, transforming the development pattern for Westchester. With the need for homes expanding after World War II, multistory apartment houses appeared in the urbanized areas of the county, while the market for single-family houses continued to expand. By 1950, the total county population was 625,816. Major interstate highways were constructed in Westchester during the 1950s and 1960s. The establishment of these roadways, along with the construction of the Tappan Zee Bridge, led to further growth in the county.

Geography
Westchester County is located in the New York metropolitan area and Downstate New York, north of New York City and south of Upstate New York. It shares its southern boundary with New York City and its northern border with Putnam County. It is bordered on the west side by the Hudson River and on the east side by the Long Island Sound and Fairfield County, Connecticut.

Where Pelham Manor meets Pelham Bay Park in the Bronx, the southern border of Westchester is just under  from Columbus Circle in Manhattan.

Long Island Sound shore
Westchester's Long Island Sound shore is generally rocky, interspersed with tidal mud flats, marshes and wetlands, as well as several natural and artificially-maintained sand beaches. Municipal and county owned parks provide access to beaches, nature preserves and passive and active waterfront recreational facilities. Several large harbors lie along the shore including Milton Harbor in Rye, Mamaroneck Harbor, Larchmont Harbor, and Echo Bay, and the upper and lower harbors in southern New Rochelle.

A number of islands can be found off the Long Island Sound shore, most of which are located in New Rochelle. Davids Island, the former location of the U.S. Army's Fort Slocum, is currently unoccupied but is slated for use as passive parkland; Glen Island, currently a Westchester Parks Department run beach and park, was one of the first amusement parks in the country serving as a summer resort at the turn of the twentieth century; Huckleberry Island is largely undeveloped, and has one of the largest rookeries in western Long Island Sound; Echo Island is owned and used by a private yacht club; Execution Rocks is the site of a 19th-century lighthouse listed on the National Register of Historic Places; Columbia, Pea, and Goose Islands are undeveloped; Clifford, Harrison and Tank Islands are part of the "Five Islands Park" and nature preserve; while Oak and Pine Islands are used as private residences.

Hudson River
In Colonial times, this area was called the Tappan Zee or Sea. The Hudson River is tidal and brackish through Westchester and contains a small number of estuarine marshes. Two bridges span the Hudson in Westchester: the Bear Mountain Bridge crosses at Cortlandt and the Tappan Zee Bridge at Tarrytown. Municipal, county and state-owned parks provide access to waterfront landmarks and sites, including Croton Point in Croton, Kingsland Point in Sleepy Hollow and JFK Memorial Marina in Yonkers.

The Hudson River waterfront in Westchester is in a transitional period, converting from primarily industrial uses to mixed residential, commercial, retail, and recreational uses. This transformation is most notable in Yonkers, Hastings-on-Hudson, Dobbs Ferry, Irvington, Tarrytown, Sleepy Hollow, Ossining, and Peekskill, where redevelopment projects are in various stages of design and completion.

At , the highest elevation in the county is a U.S. Coast and Geodetic Survey benchmark known as "Bailey" in Mountain Lakes Park near the Connecticut state line.  The lowest elevation is sea level, along both the Hudson and Long Island Sound.

Watersheds

Westchester County is divided into six primary drainage basins or watersheds: the Upper and Lower Long Island Sound; and the Bronx, Upper Hudson, Lower Hudson, and Croton River basins. Within these primary drainage basins are approximately 60 smaller basins, or subwatersheds. The principal streams draining the southern part of the county include Beaver Swamp Brook, Blind Brook, Bronx River, Hutchinson River, Mamaroneck River, Saw Mill River, Sheldrake River, Stephenson Brook and Tibbetts Brook. The primary streams draining the central part of the county include Byram River, Kisco River, Mianus River, Mill River, Pocantico River and Silvermine River. The principal streams draining the northern part of the county include Dickey Brook, Furnace Brook, Hallocks Mill Brook, Hunter Brook, Muscoot River, Peekskill Hollow Brook, and Titicus River. The county contains several major reservoirs; The Croton system and the Kensico Reservoir are important components of the New York City water supply system. The system is a series of interconnected reservoirs and lakes in northern Westchester and Putnam Counties that provide 10% of New York City's water under normal conditions and up to 30% in times of drought. The components of the system include the New Croton Reservoir, the Cross River Reservoir, the Titicus Reservoir, the Amawalk Reservoir, and the Muscoot Reservoir. Other major reservoirs are the Kensico and Byram Lake Reservoir, while there are a number of smaller reservoirs throughout the county.

The Westchester County Department of Planning divides the county into North, Central and South sub-regions.

Geology
The rock that underlies Manhattan and Westchester is chiefly gneiss and mica-schist, with layers of dolomitic marble and serpentine.

Climate
The climate of Westchester County is primarily a humid subtropical climate (Koppen Cfa), with higher elevations bordering on a humid continental climate. Winters are cold, wet, and occasionally snowy throughout the county, with more snow inland in higher elevations. Summers are hot inland but cooler towards the coast, with somewhat of a relative dryness in the early part of summer. Precipitation is plentiful and in some elevated areas reaches over 50 inches. Snowfall is more common in Westchester than in New York City, with the exception of the southeast of the county where snowfall is often between 20 and 25 inches. In January, inland areas have a low of 21–26 °F and a high of 34–37 °F while coastal areas have a low of 27–30 °F and a high of 38–41 °F. In the summer, this effect is much milder. Coastal areas, including Mamaroneck, New Rochelle, Rye, and Port Chester have highs of 81–83 °F and lows of 68–73 °F, while inland highs will be 84–87 °F and lows will be 65–70 °F. Winds can be heavy, especially by the coast.

Demographics

2010 
The racial makeup of the county was 57.4% non-Hispanic White, 15.6% African American, 0.4% Native American, 5.4% Asian, 0.1% Pacific Islander, 7.6% from other races, and 3.2% from two or more races. Hispanic or Latino of any race were 21.8% of the population. 71.7% spoke only English at home, while 14.4% spoke Spanish, 3.5% Italian, 1.1% Portuguese and 1.1% French at home.

There were 337,142 households, of which 34% had children under the age of 18 living with them, 53.9% were married couples living together, 12.2% had a female householder with no husband present, and 30.2% were non-families. Of all households 25.7% were made up of individuals, and 10.3% had someone living alone who was 65 years of age or older. The average household size was 2.67 and the average family size was 3.21.

Age distribution was 25% under the age of 18, 7.2% from 18 to 24, 30.4% from 25 to 44, 23.5% from 45 to 64, and 14% who were 65 years of age or older. The median age was 38 years. For every 100 females, there were 91.70 males. For every 100 females age 18 and over, there were 87.30 males.

According to census data, the per capita income for the county in 1999 was $36,726. The American Community Survey lists Westchester in 2011 with the median household income of $77,006, the 47th highest in the country. The U.S. Census Bureau reports that 6.4% of families and 8.7% (2003) of the population were below the poverty line, including 26.53% of those under age 18 and 7.60% of those age 65 or over.

2018 
At the American Community Survey's 2018 estimates 967,612 people inhabited the county, up 18,499 from 2010's census. 53.1% of the county was non-Hispanic white, 16.6% Black or African American, 1.0% American Indian or Alaska Native, 6.4% Asian, 0.1% Pacific Islander, 2.5% from two or more races, and 25.1% Hispanic or Latino of any race. 25.6% of the population were foreign-born. 4.2% of the population was West Indian.

From 2014 to 2018 there were 375,852 housing units and 347,332 households. The owner-occupied housing rate was 61.3% and the median monthly owner costs of a house were $3,398 with a mortgage and $1,426 without. The median gross rent in 2018 was $1,493, up $517 from the monthly owner cost without a mortgage. The average persons per household in 2018 was 2.71 and 33.3% of residents spoke a language other than English at home. 21.9% of Westchester was under 18 and 17.1% were aged 65 and older.

Westchester County's median income was $92,758 and the per capita income was $54,572. The Census Bureau reported 65.4% of the county's residents aged 16 and older were employed in the civilian labor force, and 59.5% of women worked in the labor force. 8.3% of the county lived below the poverty line from 2014 to 2018.

2020 Census

According to the 2020 American Community Survey, the county's Latino population was: 5.12% Puerto Rican, 4.46% Dominican, 4.14% Mexican, 2.73% Ecuadorian, 1.73% Guatemalan, 1.26% Colombian.

Expatriates 
As of 2000, several different expatriate populations lived in Westchester County. Notable French communities are located in Larchmont, Mamaroneck, and New Rochelle; while Scarsdale, Tarrytown and Bronxville are the preferred locations for Japanese immigrants and Japanese Americans.

Health
In March 2020 during the COVID-19 pandemic in the United States, the state government ordered a one square mile "containment zone" in the northern part of the city of New Rochelle. Part of New Rochelle is adjacent to the Bronx, where the majority of New York State's COVID-19 positive cases were (as of May 8, 350,000 out of 20 million residents). As of April 22 there were a total of 25,276 cases, 838 deaths, and 9,371 recoveries. As of May 22, 2020, there were between 30 and 35,000 cases going both by COVID-19 testing and serological samples, constituting the highest number of highest per capita infections in the world: 3% out of 1 million residents.

Communities

Westchester County has six cities, 19 towns, and 23 villages.

Cities in Westchester have many well established sub-areas within the municipal boundaries. Many of these are similar to hamlets and date back to as early as the late 1600s such as Cooper's Corners in New Rochelle. These areas also include some of the first planned communities in the country such as New Rochelle's Residence Park, Rochelle Park and Heights and Sutton Manor.

The six cities in the county are:

Any land area in the county that is not contained in one of the cities is in a town. A town may have from zero to multiple villages. The largest city in the county by population is Yonkers with over 211,000 residents. The city with the highest population density is Mount Vernon with a density of 15,564 individuals per square mile.

The towns of Harrison, Mount Kisco, and Scarsdale are coterminous with the village of the same name. Two villages are split between two towns: Briarcliff Manor crosses the border between Ossining town and Mount Pleasant, and Mamaroneck village straddles the boundary between Mamaroneck town and Rye town.

With the exception of the towns of Rye, Pelham, Harrison, Mount Kisco, and Scarsdale, all the towns contain area and residents which do not belong to any village. These areas may contain communities referred to as hamlets, or "unincorporated areas". Hamlets have no legal status and depend upon the town for all municipal government and services. There are also areas called census-designated places (CDPs), which are defined by the U.S. Census Bureau for statistical purposes only. A CDP may or may not correspond to a hamlet.

Because some municipalities have the same name, it is often necessary to indicate whether one is referring to the city, town, village, or hamlet. For example, the town of Rye is completely separate from the city of Rye. Pelham is the name of a town and also of a village in the town. The village of Mamaroneck is located partially in the town of Mamaroneck and partially in the town of Rye, but has nothing to do with the city of Rye.

Zip codes in Westchester often are not coterminous with the actual municipality borders, causing mailing addresses to sometimes differ from the actual municipal location in which a property resides. For instance, the zip codes for Bronxville, Larchmont, Rye, and Scarsdale contain large areas that lie outside of those municipalities.

All of the towns have justice courts, and some of the villages do as well.

The towns are listed as follows:
 Town
 Villages (if any), one per bullet
 CDPs (if any), all listed on a single bullet
 Communities not in a village or CDP (if any), all listed on a single bullet
(The list of towns, villages, and CDPs is complete. The listing of additional communities should not be considered complete.)

 Bedford, containing no villages:
 (contains the CDPs of Bedford, Bedford Hills and Katonah)
 (plus additional area belonging to no CDP)
 Cortlandt, containing two villages:
 Buchanan
 Croton-on-Hudson
 (contains the CDPs of Crugers, Montrose and Verplanck)
 (plus additional area belonging to no village or CDP, including the community of Cortlandt Manor)
 Eastchester, containing two villages:
 Bronxville
 Tuckahoe
 (contains the CDP of Eastchester, which encompasses all area outside the villages)
 Greenburgh, containing six villages:
 Ardsley
 Dobbs Ferry
 Elmsford
 Hastings-on-Hudson
 Irvington
 Tarrytown
 (contains the CDPs of Fairview, Greenville and Hartsdale)
 (plus additional area belonging to no village or CDP)
 Harrison, coterminous with the village of the same name (includes the communities of Purchase and West Harrison)
 Lewisboro, containing no villages:
 (contains the CDP of Goldens Bridge)
 (plus additional area belonging to no CDP, including the communities of Cross River, Lewisboro, South Salem, Vista and Waccabuc)
 Mamaroneck, containing two villages:
 Larchmont
 Mamaroneck (shared with the Town of Rye)
 (plus additional area belonging to no village (or CDP))
 Mount Kisco, coterminous with village of same name
 Mount Pleasant, containing three villages:
 Briarcliff Manor (This village is shared with the Town of Ossining.)
 Pleasantville
 Sleepy Hollow (formerly named North Tarrytown)
 (contains the CDPs of Hawthorne, Thornwood and Valhalla)
 (plus additional area belonging to no village or CDP, including the community of Pocantico Hills)
 New Castle, containing no villages:
 (contains the CDPs of Chappaqua and Millwood)
 (plus additional area belonging to no CDP)
 North Castle, containing no villages:
 (contains the CDP of Armonk)
 (plus additional area belonging to no CDP, including the communities of Banksville and North White Plains)
 North Salem, containing no villages:
 (contains the portion of the CDP of Peach Lake that is not in Putnam County)
 (plus additional area belonging to no CDP, including the communities of Croton Falls, Purdys and Salem Center)
 Ossining, containing two villages:
 Briarcliff Manor (This village is shared with the Town of Mount Pleasant.)
 Ossining (The village of Ossining is contained within the Town of Ossining.)
 (plus additional area belonging to no village or CDP, including the community of Crotonville)
 Pelham, containing two villages:
 Pelham (The Village of Pelham is contained within the Town of Pelham.)
 Pelham Manor
 (The villages cover the entire area of the town.)
 (The village of North Pelham existed from 1896 to 1975, when it was merged into the village of Pelham.)
 Pound Ridge, containing no villages:
 (contains the CDP of Scotts Corners)
 (plus additional area belonging to no CDP, including the community of Pound Ridge)
 Town of Rye (Rye is also the name of a city.), containing three villages:
 Mamaroneck (This village is shared with the Town of Mamaroneck. The portion in Rye is unofficially also called "Rye Neck". The city of Rye separates Mamaroneck from the rest of the town of Rye.)
 Port Chester
 Rye Brook (Prior to 1982, Rye Brook was the unincorporated area of the Town of Rye, and still shares the same ZIP Code as Port Chester.)
 (The villages cover the entire area of the town.)
 Scarsdale, coterminous with village of same name
 Somers, containing no villages:
 (contains the CDPs of Heritage Hills, Lincolndale and Shenorock)
 (plus additional area belonging to no CDP, including the communities of Amawalk, Baldwin Place, Granite Springs, and Somers)
 Yorktown, containing no villages:
 (contains the CDPs of Crompond, Jefferson Valley-Yorktown, Lake Mohegan, Shrub Oak and Yorktown Heights)
 (plus additional area belonging to no CDP, including the community of Kitchawan)

Economy
Due to its proximity to New York City, many Fortune 500 companies are headquartered in Westchester county, including:
 MasterCard in the hamlet of Purchase
 PepsiCo in the hamlet of Purchase
 IBM in the hamlet of Armonk
 ITT Corporation in the city of White Plains
 Jarden in the city of Rye
 Universal American in the city of White Plains
 Regeneron Pharmaceuticals in the village of Tarrytown

High technology

Tech Valley is a marketing name for the eastern part of New York State, including the Hudson Valley and the Capital District. The term originated in 1998 to promote the Greater Albany metropolitan area as a competitor to regions such as Silicon Valley and Boston. It has since grown to represent the counties in New York between IBM's Westchester County plants in the south and the Canada–U.S. border to the north.

Biotechnology
Westchester County has also developed a burgeoning biotechnology sector in the 21st century, with over $1 billion in planned private investment as of 2016, spurring Westchester Magazine to nickname the county Biochester. In April 2017, county officials unveiled plans for an 80-acre, 3 million square-foot biotechnology hub to be built with US$1.2 billion in private investment on vacant land adjacent to Westchester Medical Center in Valhalla; the bioscience center, a public-private partnership, is anticipated to create 12,000 new jobs and include over 2.25 million square feet of biotechnology research space.

Education

Westchester County contains 48 public school districts, nearly 120 private college-preparatory and parochial schools, and 15 colleges and universities. Many public and private high schools are continuously ranked among the best in New York State and the United States. Public schools in the county are largely funded by local property taxes, and the median annual property tax bill for Westchester County residents was $13,842 in 2013, the highest in the United States. According to the 2018 rankings provided by the education website Niche, taking into account public comments, 28 of the top 100 school districts in the state of New York were located in Westchester County.

Culture and recreation

Historic sites

The Timothy Knapp House, built around 1670, is the oldest standing building in Westchester. Philipse Manor Hall and the Old Dutch Church of Sleepy Hollow are also among the oldest, built around 1682 and 1685 respectively. Philipse Manor Hall is located in Getty Square, Yonkers, and is operated by the New York State Office of Parks, Recreation and Historic Preservation.

Current National Historic Landmarks in the county are:

 The Aaron Copland House
 The Armour-Stiner House
 The Boston Post Road Historic District which includes the Jay Estate and Rye Golf Club
 The Elephant Hotel
 The John Hartford House
 The John Jay Homestead
 The John William Draper House
 Kykuit
 Lyndhurst
 Old Croton Aqueduct
 Old Dutch Church of Sleepy Hollow
 Philipse Manor Hall
 Philipsburg Manor House
 Playland
 St. Paul's Church
 Stepping Stones
 Sunnyside
 Thomas Paine Cottage
 Van Cortlandt Manor
 Villa Lewaro

The former Edwin H. Armstrong House is the only delisted National Historic Landmark in Westchester.

Libraries

Westchester County is served by the Westchester Library System, established in 1958. The system comprises 38 public libraries and 25 college and special libraries in the county. The Westchester Library Association is an organization which advocates on behalf of libraries and their personnel and support systems within Westchester County.

Other attractions

 Caramoor Center for Music and the Arts, Katonah
 Donald M. Kendall Sculpture Gardens, Purchase
 The Emelin Theatre, Mamaroneck
 The Hudson River Museum, Yonkers
 The Jacob Burns Film Center, Pleasantville
 Katonah Museum of Art, Katonah
 Neuberger Museum of Art, Purchase
 New Roc City, New Rochelle
 Teatown Lake Reservation, Ossining
 Westchester Jazz Orchestra, Chappaqua
 Westchester Philharmonic, White Plains
 Westchester County Center, White Plains
 Mianus River Gorge, Bedford

African American history
There are 14 sites on Westchester County's African American Heritage Trail. The Trail was created in 2004.

Government
The Westchester County Government is headed by County Executive George Latimer, a Democrat. The district attorney is Miriam E. Rocah, and the county clerk is Timothy C. Idoni.

Board of Legislators

The Westchester County Board of Legislators is the legislative branch of Westchester County. Currently, there are fifteen Democrats, one Republican, and one Conservative who caucuses with the Republicans. The current Chair of the Board is Legislator Catherine Borgia.

Politics

|}

Westchester County generally leans toward the political left. It last voted for the Republican nominee for president in 1988.

Historically, Westchester County was a classic "Yankee Republican" county. It supported Republican presidential candidates in all but two elections from 1896 to 1988. The only exceptions were 1912, when the GOP was divided between William Howard Taft and Theodore Roosevelt, and 1964, when Lyndon B. Johnson won a national landslide and swept every county in New York. However, it swung Democratic in the early 1990s—much like other New York City suburbs. In the most recent national elections, Westchester voters tended to be far more Democratic than the national average. In fact, Westchester, after New York City and Albany County, has produced the biggest margins for statewide Democrats in recent years. Democratic voters are mainly concentrated in the more populated southern and central parts of the county. More than 63 percent of Westchester County voters voted for Barack Obama in the 2008 presidential race, the seventh-highest percentage of any New York county.

Lawler's district covers most of the county's northern half. It also includes all of Rockland and Putnam Counties and a portion of Dutchess. Bowman's district includes most of the southern half of the county, including Yonkers, Mount Vernon, White Plains, New Rochelle and Rye along with a sliver of the Bronx. 

Additionally, Republicans remain competitive with Democrats in state and local elections. For instance, it voted for Republican George Pataki, by a margin of 23.07% against Democratic candidate, Carl McCall in the gubernatorial race of 2002, and by 26.22% in 1998. Pataki hails from Westchester; he previously served as mayor of Peekskill and represented part of the county in the state Assembly and state Senate prior to being elected governor.

In 1998, County Executive Andrew Spano became just the second Democrat to hold the post in at least a half-century. In 2006, county legislator Andrea Stewart-Cousins defeated 20-year incumbent Nicholas Spano for a seat in the New York State Senate in a rematch of the 2004 race, which she had lost by only 18 votes. His brother, Assembly Member Mike Spano, switched parties in July 2007 to become a Democrat. District attorney Janet DiFiore also switched parties from Republican to Democratic in August 2007. In 2009, Republican Rob Astorino ousted three-term county executive Andy Spano, who had the endorsement of the New York Conservative Party, winning in a landslide. Astorino became the first Republican county executive since Andrew O'Rourke left the post in 1997. In 2011, the GOP broke the Democratic two-thirds majority in the county legislature by picking up two seats. However, two of the Democrats formed a coalition with the Republicans to control the board, with a Republican becoming vice-chair. In 2017 Democrats gained three seats to take outright control of the board. In 2019 Democrats gained two seats and in 2020 the last remaining Republican switched parties to become a Democrat.  As of the 2021 elections the current composition is fifteen Democrats, one Republican and one Conservative.

Westchester County was the home of U.S. Vice President Nelson Rockefeller, who occupied the Kykuit mansion near the hamlet of Pocantico Hills.

The county is also home to 42nd U.S. President Bill Clinton and Secretary of State Hillary Clinton, who live in Chappaqua. Former First Lady Barbara Bush grew up in Rye.

Former U.S. President Donald Trump owns a home in Bedford. The 230-acre Seven Springs estate was acquired by Trump in 1996.

Law enforcement and emergency services

There are currently 42 local police agencies located in Westchester County. These agencies frequently work with one another and with other agencies, including county, state, and federal law enforcement agencies responsible for protecting Westchester County.

Westchester County has a wide array of emergency services and is the home to 58 municipal fire departments, one federal fire department, 42 ambulance services, three Haz-Mat teams, a volunteer technical rescue team, a fire academy and a fire investigations unit. Each department has career, volunteer or a combination of personnel. Westchester County Department of Emergency Services operates the main dispatching system for EMS and fire departments, located in Valhalla. The department also provides numerous support services for the various agencies throughout the county.

The Career Chief's Association, a cooperative of career fire departments, also operates the Special Operations Task Force. The force consists of six squad companies that can be rapidly assembled for a major hazardous materials incident, CBRNE event, collapse or confined space rescue, or other incident requiring a large number of HazMat or rescue technicians. Over 700 firefighters, police officers and EMS providers were trained to be part of this effort and serve over half the population of Westchester County including Yonkers, Mount Vernon, New Rochelle, White Plains, Scarsdale, Eastchester, and the Fairview, Hartsdale, and Greenville Fire Departments in the Town of Greenburgh.

Media
Notable county-wide media outlets include:

Print
 The Daily Voice, a news website for Fairfield and Westchester Counties.
 El Sol, a Spanish news website covering Connecticut and Westchester.
 The Hudson Independent, a monthly newspaper serving Tarrytown, Sleepy Hollow and Irvington.
 The Journal News, a daily newspaper and news website for Westchester, Rockland, and Putnam.
 The Westchester County Press, a print newspaper produced in White Plains, part of the National Newspaper Publishers Association.
 The Westchester Guardian, a print and online newspaper, distributed three days a week.
 The Rivertowns Enterprise, a print and online newspaper covering Hastings-on-Hudson, Dobbs Ferry, Ardsley and Irvington.
 The Scarsdale Inquirer, a weekly newspaper that serves the residents of Scarsdale and Greenburgh.* El Sentir Hispano Kaffury Latin Magazine, a magazine and website that covers news, culture, lifestyle, nightlife, shopping, and other local information within Westchester, New York. It is published monthly by Today Media, website  https://www.kaffurymagazine.com
 Westchester Magazine, a magazine and website that covers news, culture, lifestyle, nightlife, shopping, and other local information within Westchester County, New York. It is published monthly by Today Media, LLC, a company located in Rye, NY. Its circulation in 2010 was over 800,000. 
Television and radio
 FiOS1 Lower Hudson Valley, a television news station available on Verizon FiOS.
 News 12 Westchester, a television news station.
 WHUD (100.7 FM), a Peekskill station that focuses on the Hudson Valley.
 WRNN-TV, a television news station in Rye Brook.
 WVBN (103.9 FM), a Hartsdale radio station focusing on Westchester.
 WVIP (93.5 FM, formerly known as WRTN), a Whitney Radio-owned New Rochelle radio station with varied programming.
 WVOX (1460 AM), a Whitney Radio-owned New Rochelle radio station with varied programming.
 WXPK (107.1 FM), a White Plains/Briarcliff Manor radio station for music.

Transportation

The combination of the county's numerous roadways and bridges, proximity to New York City, and the county's large population all lead to substantial traffic enforcement and busy local courts.

Transportation routes have been responsible for the county's development patterns, with city and town growth being most pronounced along these corridors. There are five mostly north–south corridors and three which traverse the county in the east–west direction. The north–south routes are (going from west to east): S. Route 9/Albany Post Rd/Broadway Corridor, the Saw Mill River Parkway Corridor, the Sprain Brook Parkway, the Hutchinson River Parkway, and the I-95/New England Thruway. The east–west corridors are, from south to north: the Cross County Parkway, the Cross Westchester Expressway/I-287, and the U.S. 202 corridor.

Major roadways

Major bridges
The Tappan Zee Bridge bridges the Hudson River between Tarrytown in Westchester and South Nyack in Rockland County; costing $4 billion, it was constructed during 2013–2017 to replace an earlier bridge at the same location and was renamed the Governor Mario M. Cuomo Bridge upon its opening.

Public transit
Westchester County Airport serves the county, and is adjacent to White Plains. Bus service is provided by the Bee-Line Bus System (owned by the Westchester County Department of Public Works and Transportation) within Westchester and to/from the Bronx, Manhattan, and Putnam County. Additionally, the MTA Bus Company runs to and from Getty Square in Yonkers to Midtown Manhattan. The Hudson Link operates express bus routes from city centers and train stations in Tarrytown and White Plains to Nyack, Nanuet, Spring Valley in Rockland County on the opposite side of the Hudson River.

Additionally, NY Waterway operates a water ferry service between Ossining in Westchester and Haverstraw in Rockland County.

Railroads
Amtrak serves Croton-Harmon, New Rochelle, and Yonkers. Commuter rail service in Westchester is provided by Metro-North Railroad (operated by the Metropolitan Transportation Authority). Metro-North operates three lines in the county; west to east, they are the Hudson, the Harlem, and the New Haven lines. These are former operations of the New York Central and the New York, New Haven and Hartford railroads (and their successors, Penn Central and Conrail), each of which stops in the Bronx between Westchester and Manhattan.

In popular culture 

Westchester County has been the home of many novelists, including Washington Irving. His most famous work is "The Legend of Sleepy Hollow", which is set at the Old Dutch Church of Sleepy Hollow among other locations in Sleepy Hollow, New York. The story has inspired a variety of works, including the 2013 television series Sleepy Hollow, set in the modern village.

In the X-Men multimedia series, the X-Mansion is located on the Titicus Reservoir, on Graymalkin Lane, outside of Salem Center. At the mansion, Professor Charles Xavier runs the Xavier "School for Gifted Youngsters" to educate mutant children and keeps a headquarters for the X-Men.

One of the most successful films shot in the county was the 1988 film Big. While the majority of the film takes place in New York City, the amusement park scenes were filmed in Rye Playland in Westchester.

American singer and songwriter Loudon Wainwright III recorded a song titled "Westchester County" for his 1983 LP record Fame and Wealth. It recounts his postwar upbringing in Bedford, Westchester County, New York.

In print media, the area is a frequent setting of the Nero Wolfe detective stories by Rex Stout, which ran from 1934 to 1975. An early documented mention of Westchester County is in the Trixie Belden series (which ran from 1948 to 1986). The series was set in Sleepyside-on-Hudson, a fictional village in the Hudson Valley. The original author, Julie Campbell Tatham, modeled the fictional Crabapple Farm in Sleepyside after her own home at Wolf Hollow on Glendale Road in Ossining. She also mentioned it in her last work in the series: Cherry Ames, Country Doctor's Nurse. Westchester is the primary setting and residence of the main characters in The Clique young adult novel series by Lisi Harrison. In Edward Lewis Wallant's novel The Pawnbroker, the main character Sol Nazerman lives in Mount Vernon.

In television, an early broadcast media presentation of Westchester County was on The Dick Van Dyke Show (1961–1966), whose main characters live in New Rochelle. Much was made of their suburban setting and Rob's separate world from New York City. The 1970s sitcom Maude was set in Tuckahoe. In the final season of the American sitcom Friends, the characters Monica and Chandler moved from New York City to live in Westchester. In the CBS sitcom How I Met Your Mother, Future Ted and his family live in Westchester. In the AMC show Mad Men, Ossining is home to main characters Don Draper and his family. From season 4, Don lives in Manhattan and Betty lives with Henry Francis and the children in Rye. The animated show Big Mouth is also set in Westchester County, where creator Nick Kroll grew up.

E. L. Doctorow's novel Ragtime, and the subsequent musical adaptation Ragtime: The Musical, are both partially set in New Rochelle. The town serves as a setting that represents the affluence of white suburbanites in the early stages of the 20th century.

See also

 Biodiversity of Westchester County, New York
 Downstate New York
 List of counties in New York
 National Register of Historic Places listings in Westchester County, New York
 Southern Westchester
 USS Westchester County (LST-1167)

Notes

References

 Bibliography

External links

 Westchester County Government
 The Westchester County Department of Public Safety
 
 Hudson Valley Directory, listings pertaining to Westchester County, New York

 
1683 establishments in the Province of New York
Counties in the New York metropolitan area
Long Island Sound
New York (state) counties
Populated places established in 1683
Rockefeller family